Biggar Water is a river in  Lanarkshire  and Peeblesshire, in the Southern Uplands of Scotland.

It forms part of the River Tweed system. It rises, as Biggar Burn,  in the north-east of the parish of Biggar, South Lanarkshire and flows about  generally south-westerly toward the town of Biggar, where it becomes Biggar Water. It then flows about  eastwards before its confluence with the Tweed  mile north-east of Drumelzier in Peeblesshire.

See also

List of rivers of Scotland
List of places in the Scottish Borders
List of places in Scotland

References

Rivers of the Scottish Borders
Tributaries of the River Tweed
2Biggar